Barrowcliffe is an English surname. Notable people with the surname include:

 Mark Barrowcliffe (born 1964), English writer
 Geoff Barrowcliffe (1931–2009), English professional footballer

English-language surnames